Sergio Galdós and Caio Zampieri were the defending champions but only Galdós chose to defend his title, partnering Franco Agamenone. Galdós lost in the quarterfinals to Cristian Rodríguez and Rubin Statham.

Yannick Hanfmann and Kevin Krawietz won the title after defeating Nathan Pasha and Roberto Quiroz 7–6(7–4), 6–4 in the final.

Seeds

Draw

References
 Main Draw

Visit Panamá Cup - Doubles
2018 Doubles